College Curling USA is the governing body of collegiate Curling in the US. The organization acts as the NCAA does in other college sports — setting game play, eligibility, and organizational rules. College Curling USA is affiliated with United States Curling Association (USCA), the organization responsible for organizing Olympic teams.

History
The idea of college curling in the US began in the late 1980s when the Illinois State Curling Foundation (ISCF) began to look into college curling, filling a gap between junior and adult curling levels. The ISCF, along with curling clubs, began promoting the idea of curling to schools. National Tournament began in the early 1990s with only a few schools in Northern Illinois and Wisconsin. Since then, has boomed to more than 40 schools- mostly in the Northern tier of the US and Northeast US. New Programs are starting all over the US as new clubs are being established.

In the 2012-13 season, more than 200 curlers from 36 colleges or universities participated in College Curling USA sanctioned events.

In September 2013, the College Championship became a United States Curling Association sanctioned event.

For the 2014 Curling College Championship held in Blaine, MN, Taco Bell became an official corporate sponsor.

Pre-pandemic, the USA Curling College Tour and Championship had over 450 registered college students, participating in 15 college only bonspiels from the East Coast to the Midwest.

Format
College teams compete in regional categories:

Until 2013 the regions were:
 Grand National (East Coast)
 Great Lakes
 Minnesota
 North Dakota
 Wisconsin

For the 2013 and 2014 championships, the regions were:
Region 1:  Pennsylvania, Maryland, New Jersey, Delaware, New York, Connecticut, Massachusetts, Rhode Island, Vermont, New Hampshire, and Maine
Region 2:  Lower Michigan, Ohio, and Indiana
Region 3:  Upper Michigan, Wisconsin, and Illinois
Region 4:  Minnesota and North Dakota
Region 5:  Remainder of the US

For the 2015 through 2017 championship the regions were:
Region 1:  Connecticut, Maine, Massachusetts, New Hampshire, Rhode Island, and Vermont
Region 2:  Delaware, Maryland, New Jersey, New York, and Pennsylvania
Region 3:  Indiana, Illinois, Lower Michigan, Ohio, and Southern Wisconsin
Region 4:  Upper Michigan, Minnesota, North Dakota, and Northern Wisconsin
Region 5:  Remainder of the US

After 2017 the regional aspect of the championship was abandoned except for the relabeling the former "Region 5" as the "Emerging Region."

Invitations to the National Championship are awarded based on accumulated 'merit points'. Points are primarily earned by hosting and/or competing in a collegiate bonspiel. Points can also be collected through non-bonspiel (Match Play) intercollegiate play or, for the Emerging Region schools only, through other non-college bonspiels and league play. College athletes must be members of the USA Curling and full-time students at the school they represent in order to earn points.

The national tournament is typically held in March.

Competing schools (not all are currently active) 
 Anoka-Ramsey Community College
 Bemidji State University
 Binghamton University
 Bismarck State College
 Boston University
 Bowdoin College
 Butler University
 Bowling Green State University
 Brown University
 California State University–Long Beach
 Carroll University
 Carthage College
 Colgate University
 College of St. Scholastica
 Colorado School of Mines
 Creighton University
 Eastern Michigan University
 Edgewood College
 Finlandia University
 Gustavus Adolphus College
 Hamilton College
 Hampshire College
 Harvard University
 Haverford College
 Hibbing Community College
 Illinois Valley Community College
 Itasca Community College
 Lake Forest College
 Lawrence Technological University
 Lawrence University
 Madison Area Technical College
 Minnesota State University, Mankato
 Marquette University
 Massachusetts Institute of Technology
 Mesabi Range College
 Michigan State University
 Michigan Technological University
 Minot State University
 Moorhead State University
 North Dakota State University
 Northwestern University
 Oakland University
 Ohio State University
 Ohio University
 Rensselaer Polytechnic Institute
 Rochester Institute of Technology
 Rutgers University
 St. Norbert College
 St. Olaf College
 SUNY Polytechnic Institute
 Syracuse University
 Tufts University
 Unity College
 University of Alaska-Fairbanks
 University of California–Berkeley
 University of Denver
 University of Illinois at Urbana–Champaign
 University of Maine–Orono
 University of Michigan
 University of Minnesota Duluth
 University of Minnesota Morris
 University of Nebraska–Lincoln
 University of North Dakota
 University of Oklahoma
 University of Pennsylvania
 University of Tennessee
 University of Texas at Austin
 University of Toledo
 University of Washington
 University of Wisconsin–Barron County
 University of Wisconsin–Eau Claire
 University of Wisconsin–Green Bay
 University of Wisconsin–La Crosse
 University of Wisconsin–Madison
 University of Wisconsin–Marshfield/Wood County
 University of Wisconsin–Milwaukee
 University of Wisconsin–Oshkosh
 University of Wisconsin–Rock County
 University of Wisconsin–Superior
 University of Wisconsin–Stevens Point
 Villanova University
 Washington University in St. Louis
 Weber State University
 Wellesley College
 Williams College
 Williston State College
 Winona State University
 Utica College
 Utah State University
 Yale University

2023 National Tournament
 Location: Bowling Green, OH
  Teams:  16
  Format:  Four pool round-robin
  Scheduled: March 10–12, 2023
  Gold: University of Pennsylvania
  Silver: Princeton University
  Bronze: University of Wisconsin - Superior
  Fourth: University of Minnesota
  Consolation: MIT

2022 National Tournament

 Location:  Fargo, ND - Fargo-Moorhead Curling Club
  Teams:  16
  Format:  Four pool round-robin
  Champion: University of Wisconsin - Stevens Point
  Runner-up: University of Pennsylvania
  Third: University of Wisconsin - Superior
  Fourth: Harvard
  Consolation: North Dakota State University

2022 USA Curling College Tour Results (Red indicates championship invitation)

Note: Wisc-Green Bay declined their invitation. Yale was invited in their place.

2020 and 2021 National Tournaments
Canceled due to the Covid Pandemic.
The entirety of the 2020-2021 College Tour was canceled.
The 2019-2020 College Tour took place as normal. The tour season was completed and the invitations had been sent out when the pandemic conditions reached a level where it was determined that the event could not take place. The National Championship was scheduled to take place at the Fargo-Moorhead Curling Club in Fargo, ND.

2020 USA Curling College Tour Results (Red indicates championship invitation)

2019 National Tournament

 Location:  Wayland, MA - Broomstones Curling Club
  Teams:  16
  Format:  Four pool round-robin
Champion:  North Dakota State University
Runner-up:  SUNY Polytechnic Institute
Third:  Massachusetts Institute of Technology
Fourth:  Yale University
Consolation: Syracuse University

2019 USA Curling College Tour Results (Red indicates championship invitation)

2018 National Tournament

 Location:  Eau Claire, WI - Eau Claire Curling Club
 Teams:  16
 Format:  Four pool round-robin
Champion:  University of Wisconsin - Stevens Point
Runner-up:  University of Nebraska - Lincoln
Third:  Yale University
Fourth:  University of Pennsylvania
Consolation: Rochester Institute of Technology

2018 USA Curling College Tour Results (Red indicates championship invitation)

2017 National Tournament

 Location:  Whitesboro, NY - Utica Curling Club
 Teams:  16
 Format:  Four pool round-robin
Champion:  University of Minnesota
Runner-up:  University of Nebraska - Lincoln
Third:  University of Wisconsin - Stevens Point
Fourth:  Harvard University

2017 USA Curling College Tour Results (Red indicates championship invitation)

2016 National Tournament

 Location:  Chaska, MN - Chaska Curling Center
  Teams:  16
  Format:  Four pool round-robin
Champion:  University of Pennsylvania 
Runner-up:  University of Minnesota
Third: Massachusetts Institute of Technology
Fourth: Colgate University
Fifth: Hamilton College

2016 USA Curling College Results (Red indicates championship invitation)

2015 National Tournament

  Location:  Rochester, NY - Rochester Curling Club
  Teams:  16
  Format:  Four pool round-robin
Champion:  University of Wisconsin - Stevens Point
Runner-up:  University of Pennsylvania
Third:  Massachusetts Institute of Technology
Fourth:  Rochester Institute of Technology
Fifth:  Boston University

2014 National Tournament

The 2014 College Championship was the first to be officially recognized by the USCA.

  Location:  Blaine, MN - Four Seasons Curling Club
  Teams:  16
  Format:  Four pool round-robin
Champion:  University of Wisconsin - Green Bay
Runner-up:  Villanova University
Third:  Carroll University
Fourth:  Massachusetts Institute of Technology

2013 National Tournament
  Location:  Duluth, MN - Duluth Curling Club
  Teams:  16
  Format:  Four pool round-robin
Champion:  University of Minnesota
Runner-up:  College of Saint Benedict/ Saint John's University (MN)
Third:  Massachusetts Institute of Technology
Fourth:  Boston University

2011 National Tournament
  Location:  Chicago, IL - Northshore Curling Club and Chicago Curling Club
  Teams:  32
  Divisions:  4
  Format:  Round robin

The first-place teams in each division:
  Division 1 - *Massachusetts Institute of Technology
  Division 2 - Villanova
  Division 3 - Northwestern University
  Division 4 - Bowdoin College

2010 National Tournament
  Location:  Chicago, IL - Northshore Curling Club and Chicago Curling Club
  Teams:  32
  Divisions:  4
  Format:  Round robin

The first-place teams in each division
  Division 1 - University of Wisconsin Oshkosh
  Division 2 - Northwestern University
  Division 3 - Northwestern University
  Division 4 - Carroll College

2009 National Tournament
  Location:  Chicago, IL - Northshore Curling Club and Chicago Curling Club
  Teams:  32
  Divisions:  4
  Format:  Round robin

The first-place teams in each division
  Division 1 - University of Minnesota
  Division 2 - Hamilton College
  Division 3 - University of Tennessee
  Division 4 - Northwestern University

2008 National Tournament

The 2008 College Curling National Bonspiel was held in Chicago, IL in March at the Northshore Curling Club and Chicago Curling Club.  34 teams participated this year separated into 4 divisions separated by combined years of experience.

The first-place teams in each division
  Division 1 - University of Wisconsin Eau Claire
  Division 2 - Northwestern University
  Division 3 - Hamilton College
  Division 4 - Hamilton College

Tournament sponsors 
United States Curling Association (USCA)
Illinois State Curling Foundation
Chicago Community Trust

See also
College athletics
List of College Curling Champions

References

External links
 

College curling in the United States
College sports governing bodies in the United States
Curling governing bodies in the United States